Elricia Patricia Francis (born 11 October 1975) she is a Saint Kitts and Nevis athlete.

She was part of the first ever team to represent Saint Kitts and Nevis at the Olympic Games when she competed at the 1996 Summer Olympic Games in the 4 x 100 metres relay, but the team failed to finish so didn't qualify for the next round.

References

1975 births
Living people
Saint Kitts and Nevis female sprinters
Olympic athletes of Saint Kitts and Nevis
Athletes (track and field) at the 1996 Summer Olympics
Olympic female sprinters